Robert Horne Shepherd MBE (born 1936) is a former Scottish broadcaster and author who is known for presenting shows on BBC Radio Scotland and for writing a column in Doric for Aberdeen's Press and Journal newspaper.

Shepherd was born in Dunecht, Aberdeenshire, Scotland, and is a fluent Doric speaker, a dialect spoken in Dunecht and across the northeast of Scotland. He writes a regular column in Doric for the Press and Journal and has written several books about the Doric dialect, again written in Doric.

He has also written books on Scottish dance music and Scottish country dancing, which are well known interests of his. In 1980, he took over as presenter of the BBC Radio Scotland show Take the Floor, the longest running radio programme produced in Scotland, which he hosted until 2016.  He also hosted The Reel Blend, again for BBC Radio Scotland. He previously presented episodes of The Beechgrove Garden and sheepdog trials on television for BBC Scotland.

He was honoured with an MBE in the 2001 New Year Honours for services to Scottish Dance Music and to Scottish Culture and later in 2001, the University of Aberdeen awarded Shepherd an honorary degree, as Master of the University (M.Univ). He has been awarded several other prizes and honours from Scottish music and Scottish country dance organisations in recognition of his support and work.

Shepherd is the commentator at the Braemar Gathering and an honoured life member of the Braemar Royal Highland Society. He also commentates at other Highland games throughout Scotland, including Oldmeldrum and the Lonach Highland Gathering at Strathdon.

A documentary about Shepherd's career aired on BBC Alba and BBC One Scotland in December 2013.

Bibliography

 Let's Have a Ceilidh: Essential Guide to Scottish Dancing (1992)
 A Dash O' Doric: The Wit and Wisdom of the North-East (1995)
 Anither Dash O'Doric (1996)
 Dash O'Doric 3: One for the Road (2004)
 Robbie Shepherd's Doric Columns (2006)

References

People from Garioch
1936 births
Living people
Scottish radio presenters
Members of the Order of the British Empire